Paul Gray (born 25 May 1969) is a retired Welsh athlete who competed in the 110 metres hurdles and 400 metres hurdles. He won the bronze medal at the 1994 Commonwealth Games. In addition, he represented Great Britain at two World Championships, in 1999 and 2001, without reaching the semifinals.

His personal bests are 13.53 seconds in the 110 metres hurdles (Victoria 1994) and 49.16 in the 400 metres hurdles (Budapest 1998).

Competition record

References

1969 births
Living people
Welsh male hurdlers
Commonwealth Games medallists in athletics
Commonwealth Games bronze medallists for Wales
Athletes (track and field) at the 1994 Commonwealth Games
Athletes (track and field) at the 1998 Commonwealth Games
Athletes (track and field) at the 2002 Commonwealth Games
Medallists at the 1994 Commonwealth Games
Medallists at the 1998 Commonwealth Games